Gary William Holmes (2 January 1938 – 25 September 2020) was an Australian rules footballer who played with St Kilda in the Victorian Football League (VFL).

Holmes later played for Whorouly and King Valley in the Ovens and King Football League, kicking 144 goals between 1966 and 1973.

Holmes won the 1971 Ovens & King Football League's Baker Medal, when playing with King Valley Football Club.

Notes

External links 

1938 births
Australian rules footballers from Victoria (Australia)
St Kilda Football Club players
Wangaratta Rovers Football Club players
Place of birth missing
2020 deaths